Rourkela Institute of Technology (RIT), established in 1984, is one of the oldest diploma colleges in the western Odisha Sundergarh, India. It is situated in the city outskirts of Rourkela functioning at site of Kalunga. The college is affiliated under AICTE, New Delhi, Biju Patnaik University of Technology and SCTE & VT recognized under government of Odisha.

Admission process 
 The students for Diploma are admitted through DET Odisha National level entrance test.
 For students of Master degree (MBA and MCA) are admitted through OJEE.

References

External links
 website

All India Council for Technical Education
State Council for Technical Education & Vocational Training
Engineering colleges in Odisha
Business schools in Odisha
Colleges affiliated with Biju Patnaik University of Technology
Universities and colleges in Rourkela
Educational institutions established in 1984
1984 establishments in Orissa